Next Library is a series of conferences for librarians and library professionals.

The conference series was started by Aarhus Public Libraries in 2009, conferences being held at Dokk1 in Aarhus. In 2014 a Next Library conference took place at Chicago Public Library, that Rahm Emanuel attended. In September 2018 Next Library took place at the Amerika-Gedenkbibliothek in Berlin.

It describes itself as "an international gathering of forward-thinking library professionals, innovators and decision-makers who are pushing boundaries and making changes that support learning in the 21st century", and claims that more than 1400 librarians from 96 countries are in its network, with 350 librarians attending the 2015 and 2017 events in Aarhus.

Notes and references

Cultural conferences